Hanna Elżbieta Zdanowska  (born 29 March 1959) is a Polish politician. Zdanowska is a member of the Civic Platform and the current city mayor of Łódź since 13 December 2010.

Education 
Hanna Zdanowska graduated from Lodz University of Technology. She studied engineering.

Private life 
Hanna Zdanowska was married, and divorced her husband in 1997. She has a son Robert, an artist, who graduated from the Academy of Fine Arts in Lodz. Also, since 1997, she is in an informal relationship with Włodzimierz G., an entrepreneur.

See also
 List of mayors of Łódź
 List of first female mayors 
 List of Sejm members (2007–2011)
 List of Civic Platform politicians

References

External links

Living people
Mayors of Łódź
1959 births
Women mayors of places in Poland
Civic Platform politicians
Members of the Polish Sejm 2007–2011
21st-century Polish women politicians